Aleksei Petrovich Gerasimenko (born 17 December 1970) is a Russian football coach and a former player. He is the manager of Krasnodar-2.

Honours
 Russian Premier League runner-up: 1993.
 Ukrainian Premier League winner: 1998, 1999, 2000, 2001.
 Ukrainian Cup winner: 1998, 1999, 2000.
 Top 33 best players year-end list: 1996, 1997.
 Top scorer in Second Russian Division: 1995 (30 goals in 39 games).

International career
Gerasimenko played his first game for Russia on 10 February 1997 in a Carlsberg Cup game against Switzerland. He played 7 games for Russia in his career, scoring a goal in 1998 in a friendly against Poland.

International goals

External links 
 
 Player profile 

1970 births
Living people
Russian people of Ukrainian descent
Russian footballers
Russia international footballers
Russian expatriate footballers
Expatriate footballers in Ukraine
Russian expatriate sportspeople in Ukraine
FC APK Morozovsk players
FC Kuban Krasnodar players
FC Rotor Volgograd players
FC Rostov players
FC Dynamo Kyiv players
FC Dynamo-2 Kyiv players
FC Shinnik Yaroslavl players
Russian Premier League players
Ukrainian Premier League players
FC Taganrog players
Association football forwards
Russian football managers
Sportspeople from Taganrog